Sopko is a surname. Notable people with the surname include:

Andrew Sopko (born 1994), American baseball pitcher 
Martin Sopko (born 1982), Slovak volleyball player
Oleksandr Sopko (born 1958), Ukrainian footballer
 John F. Sopko (born July 20, 1952),  United States Special Inspector General for Afghanistan Reconstruction